The Nigerian National Assembly delegation from Yobe comprises three Senators representing Yobe North, Yobe South, Yobe East and six Representatives representing  Gulani/Gujba/Damaturu/Tarmuwa, Bursari/Geidam/Yunusari, Fika/Fune, Nangere/Potiskum, Bade/Jakusko, and Yusufari/Nguru/Machina/Karasuwa. Constituencies are based on Local Government Area boundaries.

Fourth Republic

The 9th Assembly (2019 - 2023)

The 8th Assembly (2015 - date)

The 7th Assembly (2011 - 2015)

The 6th Assembly (2007 - 2011)

The 5th Assembly (2003 - 2007)

The 4th Assembly (1999 - 2003)

References
Official Website - National Assembly Senators (Yobe State)
Official Website - National Assembly House of Representatives (Yobe State)
 Senator List

Yobe State
National Assembly (Nigeria) delegations by state